Laurie Taylor (21 November 1916 – 4 October 1991) was  a former Australian rules footballer who played with South Melbourne, St Kilda and Hawthorn in the Victorian Football League (VFL).

Taylor played Camberwell Football Club in 1941.

Notes

External links 

1916 births
1991 deaths
Australian rules footballers from Victoria (Australia)
Sydney Swans players
St Kilda Football Club players
Hawthorn Football Club players
Camberwell Football Club players